This is a list of moths of Christmas Island, an Australian external territory in the Indian Ocean.

According to a recent estimate, there are 70 moth species present on Christmas Island.

Some of these species are listed below, divided into taxonomic families.

Family Crambidae
Nomophila corticalis Walker, 1869
Parotis suralis (Lederer, 1863)
Spoladea recurvalis (Fabricius, 1775)

Family Erebidae
Acantholipes similis Moore, 1879
Achaea janata (Linnaeus, 1758)
Achaea serva (Linnaeus, 1775)
Amyna axis (Guenée, 1852)
Amyna crocosticta Hampson, 1910
Amyna punctum (Fabricius, 1794)
Anomis erosa Hübner 1821
Anomis esocampta Hampson 1926
Anomis flava  (Fabricius, 1775)
Argina astrea  (Drury, 1773)
Bocula limbata (Butler, 1888)
Chasmina candida (Walker, 1865)
Dasypodia selenophora Guenée, 1852
Dysauxes ancilla (Linnaeus, 1767)
Erebus macrops (Linnaeus, 1768)
Eublemma cochylioides Guenée, 1852
Eublemma rivula Moore, 1882
Eublemma roseana Moore, 1882
Euchromia horsfieldi (Moore, 1859)
Eudocima homaena  (Hübner, 1816)
Eudocima materna (Linnaeus, 1767)
Eudocima phalonia (Linnaeus, 1763)
Eudocima salaminia (Cramer, 1777)
Euproctis pulverea (Hampson, 1900)
Deltote griseomixta (Hampson, 1900)
Hydrillodes vexillifera Hampson, 1900
Hypena indicatalis Walker, 1859
Hypena strigatus (Fabricius, 1798)
Lithacodia griseomixta (Hampson 1900) 
Lyclene distributa Walker, 1862
Maliattha signifera (Walker, [1858])
Mocis frugalis (Fabricius, 1775)
Olene inclusa (Walker, 1856)
Orgyia postica (Walker, 1855)
Pantydia metaspila (Walker, 1857)
Simplicia butesalis (Walker, 1858)
Thyas coronata (Fabricius, 1775)
Thyas honesta Hübner, 1824
Trigonodes hyppasia (Cramer, 1779)
Utetheisa lotrix (Cramer, [1777])
Utetheisa pulchelloides Hampson, 1907

Family Euteliidae
Targalla delatrix (Guenée, 1852)

Family Geometridae
Anisodes hypomion Prout, 1933
Cleora acaciaria (Boisduval, 1833)
Cleora alienaria fumipennis Prout, 1929
Comostolopsis regina Thierry Mieg, 1915
Ecliptopera phaula Prout, 1933
Ectropis scotozonea (Hampson, 1900)
Hemithea hyperymna Prout, 1933
Hyperythra lutea Stoll, 1781
Orsonoba clelia (Cramer, 1782)
Paradarisa comparataria (Walker, 1866)
Sauris hirudinata Guenée, 1858
Sauris pelagitis Prout, 1933
Sauris remodesaria Walker, 1862
Scopula actuaria (Walker, 1861)
Scopula optivata (Walker, 1861)
Scopula tumiditibia Prout, 1920
Syrrhodia vindex Prout, 1933
Thalassodes suviridis Warren 1905
Thalassodes veraria Guenée, 1857

Family Hyblaeidae
Hyblaea apricans (Boisduval, 1833)

Family Noctuidae
Aegilia describens Walker, 1857
Brana calopasa Walker, [1858]
Condica capensis (Guenée, 1852)
Dypterygia vagivitta  (Walker, 1862)
Helicoverpa assulta (Guenée, 1852)
Iambia transversa (Moore, 1882)
Mimeusemia econia Hampson, 1900
Oxyodes scrobiculata (Fabricius, 1775)
Spodoptera litura (Fabricius, 1775)
Spodoptera littoralis  (Boisduval, 1833)
Spodoptera mauritia (Boisduval, 1833)
Spodoptera picta (Guérin-Méneville, [1838])
Thysanoplusia orichalcea (Fabricius, 1775)

Family Nolidae
Armactica andrewsi Hampson
Earias cupreoviridis  (Walker, 1862)
Earias latimargo Hampson, 1912
Earias luteolaria Hampson, 1891
Lyclene distributa  Walker, 1862

Family Pyralidae
Ancylosis singhalella (Ragonot, 1889)
Corcyra cephalonica (Stainton, 1866)
Endotricha puncticostalis (Walker, [1866])
Ephestia scotella Hampson, 1900
Epicrocis oegnusalis (Walker, 1859)
Euzophera cinerosella (Zeller, 1839)
Doloessa ochrociliella Ragonot, 1893
Homoeosoma nimbella (Duponchel, 1837)

Family Sphingidae
Agrius convolvuli (Linné, 1758)
Cephonodes hylas (Linnaeus, [1771])
Daphnis placida (Walker, 1856)
Gnathothlibus erotus (Cramer, 1777)
Hippotion velox (Fabricius, 1793)
Psilogramma discistriga (Walker, 1856)
Theretra latreillii (MacLeay, 1826)

Family Tortricidae
Adoxophyes liberatrix (Diakonoff, 1947)

Family Uraniidae
Epiplema inhians Warren, 1896

See also
Lists of Lepidoptera by region

References

A Monograph of Christmas Island by Charles W. Andrews

Lists of moths by location